Sanja Vučić (born 8 August, 1993) is a Serbian singer and songwriter. Initially the lead vocalist of the Serbian crossover band ZAA, she represented Serbia at the Eurovision Song Contest 2016 with the song "Goodbye". From 2017 to 2022 she was a member of pop folk girl group Hurricane, during which time they represented Serbia in the Eurovision Song Contest 2021 with the song "Loco Loco". In addition, Vučić and Hurricane were scheduled to represent Serbia in the 2020 contest, which ended up being cancelled due to the COVID-19 pandemic.

Life and career

Early career
Vučić finished both primary and secondary music school in Kruševac, at the department of opera singing. During her studies, she sang in various ensembles, ranging from the band performing ethno music Bele vile, to the town jazz orchestra, and in the church choir Saint Prince Lazar.

ZAA (2012–2016)
The band ZAA was founded in Kruševac in 2008 and Vučić joined in April 2012. Their music is a mix of styles from ska music and dub, to post-rock, jazz and punk. They have performed in over 200 cities throughout the former Yugoslavia, and also performed in Austria, Czechia and Hungary. The band has participated in numerous festivals, like Exit, Nišville, and Reggae Serbia fest. As a member of ZAA, Vučić has made one album called What About (2014).

Eurovision Song Contest 2016

Radio Television of Serbia internally selected Sanja Vučić for the Eurovision Song Contest 2016 in Stockholm. A press conference with the artist, held by RTS, took place on 7 March 2016 in Košutnjak, Belgrade where it was announced that the song Vučić would perform at the Eurovision Song Contest would be titled "Goodbye (Shelter)" and was written by Serbian singer-songwriter and lead vocalist of the rock band Negative, Ivana Peters.

The Serbian performance at the Eurovision stage featured Sanja Vučić performing together with four backing vocalists and a male ballet dancer. The choreography and staging of the performance interpreted the song's abuse of women in domestic violence message. In the final, Serbia performed in position 15 and placed eighteenth out of the 26 participating countries, scoring 115 points.

Vučić was an international jury member in the Czech national selection process to the Eurovision Song Contest 2018 and in the first semi-final of the selection for the French entry to the Eurovision Song Contest 2019.

Hurricane (2017–2022)
In 2017, Sanja became a member of the Serbian girl group Hurricane. Their first single, "Irma, Maria", was released shortly afterwards. The group gained regional popularity with the song "Favorito". They participated in the 2020 edition of Beovizija, the Serbian national selection for the Eurovision Song Contest 2020, where they won the competition and were selected to represent Serbia at the Eurovision Song Contest 2020 with the song "Hasta la vista". However, in March the contest was cancelled due to the COVID-19 pandemic in Europe.

In November 2020, it was confirmed that Hurricane would represent Serbia at the Eurovision Song Contest 2021 with the song "Loco Loco". At the contest, Hurricane performed in the second semi-final and placed 8th with 124 points, therefore qualifying for the grand final. In the final, they placed 15th in a field of 26 entrants, scoring 102 points. After the contest, "Loco Loco" went on to become a hit in the Balkan region.

After the contest, the group released various singles and collaborations. On 4 May 2022, Hurricane announced that they would be disbanding, with its members going on to pursue their solo careers. On 20 September 2022, Vučić released her first solo single titled "Omađijan". On 29 November of the same year, Vučić released her second solo single "Đerdan", featuring the Serbian rapper Nucci. On February 18, 2023, he releases the single Hanuma in collaboration with Južni vetar and describes the situation that still happens to women today - violence.

Controversies 
On 20 September 2022, Vučić was a guest on Pink talk show Ami G Show, together with Maja Nikolić, Sajsi MC, Predrag Azdejković and Vesna Vukelić Vendi. Following the 2022 EuroPride, held the previous week in Belgrade, all of the guests stated their opinions on Belgrade Pride, leading to a conflict between the LGBT activist Azdejković and the anti-LGBT Vukelić. Vučić stated: "I am liberal and I believe that everybody needs to express their freedom, and love is love. About the parade itself, I don't want to make a stance." Her hesitance to unequivocally support the parade was met with controversy from her fans. The next day, Vučić took to Instagram and made a statement: "I would like to clarify some things about last night's show, I have to say I was very uncomfortable and I was not used to the tone that the show took in its certain parts, and led by that I wanted to avoid being part of the discourse, primarily because I was a guest on the show for different reasons. I have always been an ally, love and equality will always have my support!"

Discography

With ZAA

Studio albums
 What About (2014)

With Hurricane

As a solo artist

Singles

As featured artist

Filmography

Notes

References

Living people
Musicians from Kruševac
21st-century Serbian women singers
Serbian punk rock musicians
Eurovision Song Contest entrants for Serbia
Eurovision Song Contest entrants of 2016
Women punk rock singers
Year of birth missing (living people)